Majhila is a small village between the towns of Koraon and Kohnar in Meja Tehsil, Allahabad District, Uttar Pradesh, India. It has a population of approximately 300 people.

Villages in Allahabad district